A list of films produced in Singapore in 2012:

References

2012
Films
Singaporean